Kratzville is an unincorporated community in Center Township, Vanderburgh County, in the U.S. state of Indiana.

It is located within the city limits of Evansville.

Geography

References

Unincorporated communities in Vanderburgh County, Indiana
Unincorporated communities in Indiana